The Reformed and Presbyterian Fellowship of India is a national ecumenical organization, bringing together Presbyterian and Continental Reformed churches in India.

It was formed in 2001 and in 2019 it was formed by 14 member denominations.

History 

In 1969, the Reformed Presbyterian Church of India established the Dehradun Presbyterian Theological Seminary, which, unlike other Presbyterian theological institutions in India, rejected Theological liberalism and subscribed to the Westminster Confession of Faith.

In the following decades, various Presbyterian and Continental Reformed denominations began to send their pastors for seminary training.

This training of pastors of various denominations in the same seminary led to a rapprochement between them and the formation of the Reformed and Presbyterian Fellowship of India in 2001.

Members 

In 2019, Fellowship members were:
 Reformed Presbyterian Church of India
Reformed Presbyterian Church North East India
Presbyterian Church in India (Reformed)
Presbyterian Reformed Church in India
Presbyterian Free Church of Central India
Free Presbyterian Church, Kalimpong
Presbyterian Church of South India
South India Reformed Churches
Evangelical Presbyterian Church of Sikkim
Evangelical Reformed Church of India
Christian Reformed Fellowship of India
Reformed Covenant Assembly (India) (mission of United Reformed Churches in North America)
Reformed Churches in South Africa
Protestant Reformed Church (India) (mission of Protestant Reformed Churches in America).

References 

Presbyterianism in India